The European Perforators Association, commonly known as Europerf, is the European association for the metal perforating industry.

History
Europerf was established in 1962. It is a not-for-profit association.

Structure
It represents 17 members in 11 EU member states. Perforated metal is used in many industries including food processing, building, vehicles and the chemical industry.

Europerf is located in Brussels, Belgium, in the same building as Pneurop, Comité Européen de l'Industrie de la Robinetterie, European Federation of Materials Handling or Orgalime.

Its annual meeting, organised by the Europerf secretariat, is held every year in May/June. The 2012 edition took place in Lisbon, Portugal, when Europerf elected a new president, Hans-Ulrich Koch, and vice president, Fred Graepel. The former president was Richard Bunker.

Perforated metal use
Perforated metal is used in construction (e.g. facade), in industrial and food processing industry (e.g. grain drying, seed grading), in the automobile industry or household appliances (e.g. dishwasher filters).

Perforated metal sheets found on buildings are mostly if not only made of stainless steel. In addition to its light weight, solar shading effects, light deflection, natural ventilation or noise reduction, it benefits from the intrinsic good points of stainless steel like resistance to corrosion or low LCA.

Noise reduction
Europerf promotes the benefits of perforated metal sheets. For example, perforated metal cladding reduces sound levels.

International co-operation
Europerf haslinks with similar associations worldwide like the North American Association IPA

References

External links
 Europerf website

Pan-European trade and professional organizations
Trade associations based in Belgium